Pangaaligal is a 1961 Indian Tamil-language film directed by G. Ramakrishna. The film stars Gemini Ganesan, M. R. Radha, Anjali Devi and Devika. It was released on 16 December 1961.

Plot 
Three poor men (Ranga Rao, Sarangapani and Muthaiah) get together, form a partnership and establish a metal vessel factory. Rao gets hold of the authority and make the other two as wage earners. Rao's son (Radha) goes abroad for studies and comes back as a fully westernised man. He marries the daughter (Anjali Devi) of one of the wage earners as agreed upon earlier. But he is not interested in her and ill-treats her. The son of that wage earner (Gemini Ganesan) goes to Malaysia to learn a trade. When he returns he finds that his sister is married to Radha and undergoes ill-treatment. The other wage earner had two daughters. One of them, (Devika) is lost during a festival and was brought up by a railway porter (Durairaj and  family. They make her a dancer so as to exploit rich men. They get hold of Radha. The other daughter (Saroja) and Ganesan become lovers. The porter family swindles all his wealth from Radha and he is reduced to living in a hut. He realises his folly. Ganesan helps to sort out matters and all ends well.

Cast 
The list is compiled from The Hindu review article and from the book Thiraikalanjiyam.

Male cast
Gemini Ganesan as Ponnaiya
M. R. Radha as Selvaraj
S. V. Ranga Rao as Thiruvasagam
K. Sarangapani as Kannayiram
T. S. Muthaiah as Marudhamuthu

Male cast (contd.)
T. S. Durairaj as Nadesa Pillai
Karikol Raju as Nagalingam
K. Sayeeram
Gemini Balu
Sandow Krishnan

Female cast
Anjali Devi as Meenatchi
Devika as Rani/Kamalam
E. V. Saroja as Valli
K. Malathi as Ponnamma
P. S. Gnanam

Production 
The film was produced by T. Kanmani, C. K. Kannan and P. Rangasami Reddiar under the banner Iris Movies. M. S. Solaimalai wrote the screenplay and dialogues while the film was directed by G. Ramakrishna who is a nephew of K. Ramnoth.

Soundtrack 
Music was composed by S. Dakshinamurthi while the lyrics were penned by A. Maruthakasi, Kannadasan and Ku. Ma. Krishnan.

Release and reception 
Pangaaligal was released on 16 December 1961. On 22 December, The Indian Express said, "A host of characters swarm around the story with little apparent purpose. But some of the roles, such as that of Anjali, S. V. Ranga Rao, Gemini Ganesh and a few others are acted well enough for their irrelevance to be overlooked".

References

External links 

1960s Tamil-language films
1961 drama films
Films scored by Susarla Dakshinamurthi
Indian drama films